, or officially  is a district of Chiyoda, Tokyo, Japan.

The closest station is Hibiya Line Akihabara Station, which is located in Kanda-Matsunagachō, Kanda-Hanaokachō and Kanda-Neribeichō. While Yamanote Line and Keihin-Tōhoku Line run in the district, JR Akihabara Station is located in Kanda-Hanaokachō.

Adjacent Districts
Kanda-Neribeichō - North
Kanda-Matsunagachō - East
Kanda-Hanaokachō - South
Soto-Kanda - West

Education
 operates public elementary and junior high schools. Izumi Elementary School (和泉小学校) is the zoned elementary of Kanda-Aoicho. There is a freedom of choice system for junior high schools in Chiyoda Ward, and so there are no specific junior high school zones.

References

Districts of Chiyoda, Tokyo